The Women's 5000 metres competition at the 2019 World Single Distances Speed Skating Championships was held on 9 February 2019.

Results
The race was started at 13:15.

References

Women's 5000 metres